Shahin Qaleh (also Romanized as Shāhīn Qal‘eh; also known as Emām Qal‘eh) is a village in Miyan Velayat Rural District, in the Central District of Mashhad County, Razavi Khorasan Province, Iran. At the 2006 census, its population was 239, in 61 families.

References 

Populated places in Mashhad County